The 1995 Winter Universiade, the XVII Winter Universiade, took place in Jaca, Spain.

Medal table

1995
Universiade
Uni
Multi-sport events in Spain
Sport in Aragon
Winter Universiade
February 1996 sports events in Europe
Winter sports competitions in Spain